Harston was a railway station on the Cambridge Line, which served the village of Harston in Cambridgeshire. The station opened on 1 April 1852, and closed on 17 June 1963. A small part of the former southbound platform remains in situ but otherwise all remains of the station have gone. However, the Cambridge Line, which formerly served the station, remains an increasingly busy commuter line connecting the East Coast Main Line to the West Anglia Main Line.

Routes

References

Disused railway stations in Cambridgeshire
Former Great Eastern Railway stations
Railway stations in Great Britain opened in 1852
Railway stations in Great Britain closed in 1963
1852 establishments in England
railway station